This is a list of the Nicktoons series Wild Grinders. The series premiered on April 27, 2012. The second season previewed on December 23, 2013, and officially premiered on February 5, 2014 and ended on February 12, 2015.

Series overview

Episodes

Season 1 (2012–13)

Season 2 (2013–15) 

Wild Grinders